Penny J. White (born May 3, 1956) is an American attorney and former judge who is on the faculty of the University of Tennessee College of Law. She was a Tennessee circuit court judge, a member of the Tennessee Court of Criminal Appeals, and a justice of the Tennessee Supreme Court before being removed from office in a judicial retention election. She is the only Tennessee judge ever to lose a judicial retention election under the Tennessee Plan.

Early life and education
White was born in Kingsport, Tennessee in 1956. She attended East Tennessee State University (ETSU), graduating with a B.S. degree in 1978. At ETSU she was the first female president of the Student Government Association.  After graduation, she went on to study law at the University of Tennessee College of Law, where she was awarded the J.D. degree in 1981, and Georgetown University Law Center, where she was awarded an LL.M. degree in 1987.

Legal and judicial career
White engaged in the private practice of law in Johnson City, Tennessee, from 1981 to 1983 and from 1985 to 1990. From 1983 to 1985 she served as supervising attorney and clinical instructor in the Georgetown University Law Center Criminal Justice Clinic.

Penny White impressed Justice Scalia and the Supreme Court when she appeared before them at the age of 32. The New Yorker article on Scalia note: "In a 1988 speech, Justice Harry Blackmun, who retired in 1994, recalled how Scalia had grilled a lawyer named Penny White, a thirty-two-year-old solo practitioner from Johnson City, Tennessee. He "picked on her and picked on her and picked on her, and she gave it back to him," Blackmun said. "Finally, at the end of the case we walked off, and Nino said the only thing he could say: 'Wasn't she good? Wasn't she good?' The rest of us were completely silent. We knew she was very good."

In 1990, she won election to a judgeship in Tennessee's First Judicial Circuit. In 1992 she left the circuit judgeship when Tennessee Governor Ned McWherter appointed her to the state's Court of Criminal Appeals. She served on that court until 1994, when McWherter selected her to fill a vacancy on the Tennessee Supreme Court. She became the second woman ever to serve on the state's highest court.

Vote on judicial retention
White became a subject of controversy in 1996 when she voted with the court majority in the 3-2 decision in the case of State v. Odom. That June 3, 1996 decision upheld a conviction for the  rape and murder of an elderly woman, but overturned a death sentence in the case on the grounds that the combination of rape with murder did not meet the requirements for the death penalty because the rape did not cause the murder to be "especially heinous, atrocious, or cruel in that it involved torture or serious physical abuse beyond that necessary to produce death."  It was the only death penalty decision that White ever participated in as a member of the state supreme court. In a law review article published several years later, White wrote that Tennessee law at the time of the case allowed capital punishment and that she would have voted to affirm a death sentence "that was imposed in accordance with the law."

While a member of the Tennessee Court of Criminal Appeals, as well as the Tennessee Supreme Court White was criticized for at least three opinions on capital murder cases. 
Suzanne Collins, a 19 year old female Marine was assaulted, kidnapped, beaten, and ultimately killed by having a 31 inch tree branch thrust between her legs so deeply it penetrated her vital organs and punctured a lung. Sedley Alley was convicted and sentenced to death.
Tennessee State Trooper Doug Tripp was shot 12 times in the head and torso in two separate volleys from a suspect while sitting in his cruiser. 
78 year old Mina Ethel Johnson was raped, and repeatedly stabbed during an attack by Richard Odom.
In the Collins and Johnson cases White's opinion was that these murders did not meet the definition of "especially heinous, atrocious, and cruel". In the Trooper Tripp case, White held there was not sufficient evidence of premeditation, and the charge was reduced to 2nd degree murder. Trooper Tripp's killer was paroled after 17 years.

As a recent appointee, White was the only member of the court who was subject to a retention vote in that year's election, and she was targeted for defeat by victims' rights advocates, the Tennessee Conservative Union, and death penalty proponents who opposed the decision. White was restrained from campaigning on her own behalf by the judicial code of ethics, but her opponents "flooded the state" with materials urging her defeat. One mailing urged voters to "Vote for capital punishment by voting NO on August 1 for Supreme Court Justice Penny White." She was publicly opposed by Governor Don Sundquist and U.S. Senators Bill Frist and Fred Thompson, all Republicans. As a result of the campaign against her, the "no" vote prevailed in the August 1, 1996, retention election, causing her to be removed from the court. Only 19 percent of the state's voters voted in White's retention election.  Sundquist subsequently appointed Janice Holder to fill the seat she vacated.
Judge White's advocacy campaign, "People To Retain Justice White" raised over 10 times the funds of their counterparts, yet White was recalled during the election.

The defeat of White's judicial retention election was decried by people concerned that election of judges politicizes the judiciary, as well as by opponents of the death penalty. In a speech before the American Bar Association two days after White's defeat, U.S. Supreme Court Justice John Paul Stevens stated that he considered the popular election of judges to be "profoundly unwise." He stated: "A campaign promise to be 'tough on crime' or 'enforce the death penalty' is evidence of bias that should disqualify the candidate from sitting in criminal cases." The political nature of White's removal from the court has been likened to the earlier election defeat of California Chief Justice Rose Bird.

When Adolpho A. Birch, who was chief justice of the court at the time of the State v. Odom decision, came up for a judicial retention vote in 1998, death penalty supporters campaigned for his removal. However, he was the beneficiary of a public awareness campaign on the importance of judicial retention elections that was mounted by the state's bar association, Farm Bureau, and League of Women Voters in Tennessee, and he retained his seat with 54 percent of the vote.

Law school faculty career
After leaving the state supreme court, White held one-year law school visiting professorships at Washington and Lee University (1997–1998), West Virginia University (1998–1999), and the University of Denver (1999–2000). In 2000 she joined the faculty of the University of Tennessee College of Law, where she is Elvin E. Overton Distinguished Professor of Law and directs the Center for Advocacy and Legal Clinic.

References

1956 births
Living people
American legal scholars
American women judges
East Tennessee State University alumni
Georgetown University Law Center alumni
People from Kingsport, Tennessee
Tennessee lawyers
Tennessee state court judges
Justices of the Tennessee Supreme Court
University of Tennessee College of Law alumni
University of Tennessee faculty
American women legal scholars
American women academics
21st-century American women
20th-century American women judges
20th-century American judges